The UK Singles Chart is one of many music charts compiled by the Official Charts Company that calculates the best-selling singles of the week in the United Kingdom. Before 2004, the chart was only based on the sales of physical singles. This list shows singles that peaked in the Top 10 of the UK Singles Chart during 1961, as well as singles which peaked in 1960 and 1962 but were in the top 10 in 1961. The entry date is when the single appeared in the top 10 for the first time (week ending, as published by the Official Charts Company, which is six days after the chart is announced).

One-hundred and four singles were in the top ten in 1961. Eleven singles from 1960 remained in the top 10 for several weeks at the beginning of the year, while "Midnight in Moscow" by Kenny Ball and His Jazzmen, "Moon River" by Danny Williams with Geoff Love and His Orchestra and "Stranger on the Shore" by Mr Acker Bil" were all released in 1961 but did not reach their peak until 1962. "I Love You" by Cliff Richard and The Shadows and "Poetry in Motion" by John Tillotson were the singles from 1960 to reach their peak in 1961. Twenty-eight artists scored multiple entries in the top 10 in 1961. Bobby Vee, Del Shannon, Eden Kane, Helen Shapiro, Kenny Ball and Matt Monro were among the many artists who achieved their first UK charting top 10 single in 1961.

The 1960 Christmas number-one, "I Love You" by Cliff Richard, remained at number one for the first two weeks of 1961. The first new number-one single of the year was "Poetry in Motion" by Johnny Tillotson. Overall, twenty-one different singles peaked at number-one in 1961, with Elvis Presley (4) having the most singles hit that position.

Background

Multiple entries
One-hundred and four singles charted in the top 10 in 1961, with ninety-two singles reaching their peak this year. Three songs were recorded by several artists with each version reaching the top 10:

"Michael, Row the Boat Ashore" - The Highwaymen (version known as "Michael"), Lonnie Donegan (version known as "Michael, Row the Boat")
"Rubber Ball" - Bobby Vee, Marty Wilde
"Sailor" - Anne Shelton, Petula Clark

Twenty-eight artists scored multiple entries in the top 10 in 1961. The Shadows secured the record for most top 10 hits in 1961 with nine hit singles, four of which were with Cliff Richard.

The Everly Brothers was one of a number of artists with two top-ten entries, including the number-one single "Walk Right Back"/"Ebony Eyes". Craig Douglas, Eden Kane, Matt Monro, Petula Clark and The Temperance Seven were among the other artists who had multiple top 10 entries in 1961.

Chart debuts
Twenty-eight artists achieved their first top 10 single in 1961, either as a lead or featured artist. Of these, seven went on to record another hit single that year: Clarence "Frogman" Henry, Del Shannon, Eden Kane, John Leyton, Karl Denver, Matt Monro and The Temperance Seven. Helen Shapiro achieved two more chart hits in 1961. Bobby Vee had three other entries in his breakthrough year.

The following table (collapsed on desktop site) does not include acts who had previously charted as part of a group and secured their first top 10 solo single.

Songs from films
Original songs from various films entered the top 10 throughout the year. These included "Wooden Heart (Muss i denn)" (from G.I. Blues), "Theme from Exodus" (Exodus), "Where the Boys Are" (Where the Boys Are), "The Frightened City" (The Frightened City), "Climb Ev'ry Mountain" (The Sound of Music), "Wild in the Country" (Wild in the Country), "When the Girl in Your Arms Is the Girl in Your Heart" (The Young Ones) and "The Time Has Come" (What a Whopper)

Additionally, the original Spanish language version of "Perfidia" sung by Desi Arnaz featured in the 1941 film Father Takes a Wife. Duane Eddy covered the title song to the comedy film Pepe. Shirley Jones had been responsible for the version on the soundtrack. American songwriter Hoagy Carmichael's recording of "(Up a) Lazy River" (simply called "Lazy River" when released by Bobby Darin) was briefly heard in the 1946 film The Best Years of Our Lives, as well as the 1959 film Hey Boy! Hey Girl!. The Marcels' version of "Blue Moon" was referenced in the Disney animated short-film A Symposium on Popular Songs. "You'll Never Know" was first introduced in the 1943 film Hello, Frisco, Hello, sung by Alice Faye, winning the Academy Award for Best Original Song at that year's ceremony.

Elvis Presley covered "What'd I Say", originally by Ray Charles, and it featured in the 1964 film Viva Las Vegas. "Mexicali Rose" appeared in the 1939 film of the same name. Similarly, "You Must Have Been a Beautiful Baby" was on the soundtrack the previous year to the film Hard to Get. "Moon River" was written for Breakfast at Tiffany's to be performed by Audrey Hepburn. Johnny Burnette's song "You're Sixteen" would later feature prominently in the 1973 film American Graffiti.

Best-selling singles
Until 1970 there was no universally recognised year-end best-sellers list. However, in 2011 the Official Charts Company released a list of the best-selling single of each year in chart history from 1952 to date. According to the list, "Wooden Heart" by Elvis Presley is officially recorded as the biggest-selling single of 1961.

Top-ten singles
Key

Entries by artist

The following table shows artists who achieved two or more top 10 entries in 1961, including singles that reached their peak in 1960 or 1962. The figures include both main artists and featured artists. The total number of weeks an artist spent in the top ten in 1961 is also shown.

Notes

 "Moon River" reached its peak of number one on 3 January 1962 (week ending).
 "Midnight in Moscow" reached its peak of number two on 10 January 1962 (week ending).
 "My Heart Has a Mind of Its Own" re-entered the top 10 at number 10 on 4 January 1961 (week ending).
 "Man of Mystery"/"The Stranger" re-entered the top 10 at number 7 on 18 January 1961 (week ending) for 2 weeks.
 "Goodness Gracious Me" re-entered the top 10 at number 7 on 11 January 1961 (week ending) for 3 weeks.
 "Sailor" (Petula Clark version) re-entered the top 10 at number 10 on 29 March 1961 (week ending).
 "FBI" re-entered the top 10 at number 7 on 12 April 1961 (week ending) for 3 weeks.
 "Are You Sure?" was the United Kingdom's entry at the Eurovision Song Contest in 1961.
 "Lazy River" re-entered the top 10 at number 5 on 19 April 1961 (week ending) for 3 weeks.
 "Where the Boys Are"/"Baby Roo" re-entered the top 10 at number 5 on 3 May 1961 (week ending) for 2 weeks.
 "War Paint" re-entered the top 10 at number 9 on 31 May 1961 (week ending).
 "Don't Treat Me Like a Child" re-entered the top 10 at number 7 on 7 June 1961 (week ending).
 "Pasadena" re-entered the top 10 at number 9 on 6 September 1961 (week ending).
 "Running Scared" re-entered the top 10 at number 10 on 26 July 1961 (week ending).
 "You Don't Know" re-entered the top 10 at number 10 on 18 October 1961 (week ending).
 "Time" re-entered the top 10 at number 9 on 16 August 1961 (week ending) for 3 weeks.
 "Sucu Sucu" re-entered the top 10 at number 10 on 22 November 1961 (week ending).
 "Hit the Road Jack" re-entered the top 10 at number 10 on 29 November 1961 (week ending).
 "Stranger on the Shore" re-entered the top 10 at number 8 on 21 March 1962 (week ending) for 5 weeks and at number 10 on 9 May 1962 (week ending).
 Figure includes single that peaked in 1960.
 Figure includes single that first charted in 1961 but peaked in 1962.
 Figure includes single that peaked in 1962.

See also
1961 in British music
List of number-one singles from the 1960s (UK)

References
General

Specific

External links
1961 singles chart archive at the Official Charts Company (click on relevant week)

1961 record charts
1961
1961 in British music